XHMVM-FM is a radio station in Maravatío, Michoacán. XHMVM broadcasts on 98.3 FM and is owned by Voz de Maravatío, A.C.

History
XHMVM received its social concession on February 3, 2016. The station is related to the cluster of XHETA-FM/XHLX-FM in Zitácuaro.

References

Radio stations in Michoacán